is a railway station in the city of Sakura, Tochigi, Japan, operated by the East Japan Railway Company (JR East).

Lines

Station layout
This station has one island platform and one side platform connected to the station building by a footbridge. The station has a Midori no Madoguchi staffed ticket office.

Platforms

History
Ujiie Station opened on 25 February 1897. With the privatization of JNR on 1 April 1987, the station came under the control of JR East.

Passenger statistics
In fiscal 2019, the station was used by an average of 3222 passengers daily (boarding passengers only).

Surrounding area
 
 
Kinugawa River
Ujie Post Office

See also
 List of railway stations in Japan

References

External links

  JR East station information 

Railway stations in Tochigi Prefecture
Tōhoku Main Line
Utsunomiya Line
Railway stations in Japan opened in 1897
Sakura, Tochigi
Stations of East Japan Railway Company